Robert Carranza  is an American recording engineer, mixer and record producer.

Selected discography
2017 – Heaven Upside Down – Marilyn Manson
2016 – Dont Go She Gone – Mangchi
2015 – The Pale Emperor – Marilyn Manson
2014 – Convoque Seu Buda – Criolo
2010 – Keyboard City – Salvador Santana
2009 – Zee Avi – Zee Avi
2009 – Jack Johnson En Concert – Jack Johnson
2009 – Arte De La Elegancia De – LFC Los Fabulosos Cadillacs
2009 – 1 Up! – IllScarlett
2008 – SSB – Salvador Santana Band
2008 – Sleep Through the Static – Jack Johnson
2008 – Sirenas – División Minúscula
2008 – One Day as a Lion – One Day as a Lion
2008 – Maestro – Taj Mahal
2008 – Luz del Ritmo – Los Fabulosos Cadillacs
2008 – In the Ever – Mason Jennings
2008 – The Secret War – Shadow Jaguar
2008 – The Bedlam in Goliath – The Mars Volta
2008 – 10,000 Steps – Biomusique
2007 – Se Dice Bisonte, No Bùfalo – Omar Rodriguez-Lopez Group
2007 – Roses & Clover – Animal Liberation Orchestra
2007 – Eternamiente – Molotov
2007 – Don't Mess with the Dragon – Ozomatli

Film credits
Sucker Punch
Super
300
The Devil's Rejects
Slither
Dawn of the Dead
What's the Worst That Could Happen?
Rated X
Trouble Bound
The Last Time I Committed Suicide
Fall Time
Baadasssss!
Kingdom Come
Born Bad
Denial
Alien Avengers
The Crow: City of Angels

External links
 May 2008 Interview
 Discography at Discogs
 

Living people
Record producers from California
American audio engineers
Year of birth missing (living people)
Place of birth missing (living people)